Maurice Druon's Les Rois maudits (The Accursed Kings) sequence of historical novels has been adapted twice as miniseries for French television. Dubbed "the French I, Claudius", the 1972 TV adaptation of Les Rois maudits was broadcast by the ORTF from 21 December 1972 to 24 January 1973 and has been called "hugely successful". A joint French-Italian adaptation was broadcast on France 2 from 7 November to 28 November 2005.

Cast

Episodes

1972 miniseries

2005 miniseries

References

External links
 
 
French Wikipedia
 fr:Les Rois maudits
 fr:Les Rois maudits (mini-série, 1972)
 fr:Les Rois maudits (mini-série, 2005)

Lists of drama television series episodes
Lists of French television series characters